
Year 360 (CCCLX) was a leap year starting on Saturday (link will display the full calendar) of the Julian calendar. At the time, it was known as the Year of the Consulship of Constantius and Iulianus (or, less frequently, year 1113 Ab urbe condita). The denomination 360 for this year has been used since the early medieval period, when the Anno Domini calendar era became the prevalent method in Europe for naming years.

Events 
 By place 

 Roman Empire 
 February – Julian, Roman Caesar, is proclaimed emperor by the Gallic legions in Lutetia (modern Paris), at the Thermes de Cluny. They refuse to support the eastern campaign against King Shapur II of Persia, and revolt.
 The Alamanni raid Raetia (Switzerland), but are pushed back behind the Rhine by Julian, into the Black Forest.
 King Shapur II continues his campaign against the Roman fortresses, capturing Singara, Bezabde and Nisibis.
 Emperor Constantius II and Julian exchange several letters, both hoping to avoid a civil war.

 Europe 
 The Huns invade Europe by the thousands, spreading terror as they take over territories held for generations by Alans, Heruls, Ostrogoths and Visigoths.

 Asia 

 By topic 

 Agriculture 
 Roman authorities in Britain export wheat to supply the legions on the Rhine; they have encouraged production of wheat for that purpose.

 Religion 
 Council of Constantinople (360): Emperor Constantius II requests a church council, at Constantinople; both the eastern and western bishops attend the meeting. Ulfilas also attends the council and endorses the resulting creed. After the council several homoiousian bishops are deposed or banished, including Macedonius I of Constantinople and Cyril of Jerusalem.
 At about this date, Ligugé Abbey in France is founded for the monastic Order of Saint Benedict by Martin of Tours, under dispensation from Bishop Hilary of Poitiers.

Births 
 John Cassian, Desert Father and Christian saint (approximate date)
 Saint Mesrob, Armenian monk and theologian (approximate date)
 Saint Ninian, missionary to Scotland (approximate date)
 Tao Sheng, Chinese Buddhist scholar (approximate date)
 Wang Fahui, empress during the Jin Dynasty (d. 380)

Deaths 

 May 4 – Judas Cyriacus, Roman Catholic priest and saint
 October 14 – Gaudentius of Rimini, Roman Catholic priest and saint
 November 11 – Abramios the Recluse, Byzantine Orthodox priest and saint
 December 18 – Auxentius of Mopsuestia, Byzantine Orthodox priest and saint

Date unknown 
 Eusebius of Emesa, Byzantine Orthodox bishop and saint (b. 290)
 Murong Jun, emperor of the Former Yan (b. 319)

References